The 2018 Copa Sudamericana Finals was the two-legged final to decide the winner of the 2018 Copa Sudamericana, the 17th edition of the Copa Sudamericana, South America's secondary international club football tournament organized by CONMEBOL.

The finals were contested in two-legged home-and-away format between Colombian team Junior and Brazilian team Atlético Paranaense. The first leg was hosted by Junior at the Estadio Metropolitano Roberto Meléndez in Barranquilla on 5 December 2018, while the second leg was hosted by Atlético Paranaense at the Arena da Baixada in Curitiba on 12 December 2018. This was the last final to take place over two legs, as starting from 2019 the final will be played as a single match at a venue chosen in advance.

Tied 2–2 on aggregate, Atlético Paranaense won 4–3 on penalties, winning the tournament for the first time in their history. As champions, Atlético Paranaense earned the right to play against the winners of the 2018 Copa Libertadores in the 2019 Recopa Sudamericana, and the winners of the 2018 J.League Cup in the 2019 J.League Cup / Copa Sudamericana Championship. Atlético Paranaense also automatically qualified for the group stage of the 2019 Copa Libertadores.

Teams

Venues

Road to the final

Note: In all results below, the score of the finalist is given first (H: home; A: away).

Format
The final was played on a home-and-away two-legged basis, with the higher-seeded team (Atlético Paranaense) hosting the second leg. The away goals rule was not applied, and extra time would be played if the aggregate score was tied after the second leg. If the aggregate score was still tied after extra time, a penalty shoot-out would have been used to determine the winner. If extra time was played, a fourth substitution would have been allowed.

Matches

First leg

Second leg

See also
2018 Copa Libertadores Finals
2019 Recopa Sudamericana
2019 J.League Cup / Copa Sudamericana Championship

References

External links
CONMEBOL Sudamericana 2018, CONMEBOL.com 

2018
Finals
December 2018 sports events in South America
Atlético Junior matches
Club Athletico Paranaense matches
2018 in Colombian football
2018 in Brazilian football
Sport in Barranquilla
Sport in Curitiba
21st century in Barranquilla
21st century in Curitiba
International club association football competitions hosted by Colombia
International club association football competitions hosted by Brazil
Copa Sudamericana Finals 2018